Timothy John Head (born 22 September 1957, Hammersmith, London, England) is a former English cricketer.  Head was a right-handed batsman who fielded as a wicket-keeper.

Head made his first-class debut for Sussex against Oxford University in 1976.  He made 21 further first-class appearances for the county, the last of which came against the touring Australians in 1981.  In his 22 first-class matches for Sussex, he scored a total of 335 runs at an average of 16.75, with a high score of 52 not out.  Behind the stumps he took 54 catches and made 6 stumpings.  This score was his only first-class half century and came against the Australians in 1981.  Head made his debut in List A cricket for the county in 1978, against Middlesex in the John Player League.  He made eight further List A appearances for the county, the last of which came against Glamorgan in the 1980 John Player League.  In his nine List A appearances, he scored a total of 50 runs at an average of 10.00, with a high score of 24.  Behind the stumps he took 7 catches and made 2 stumpings.

He later studied at the University of Cambridge, making three first-class appearances while there for Cambridge University Cricket Club in 1986, against Leicestershire, Essex and Sussex.  He scored 62 runs in these three matches, which came at an average of 15.50, with a high score of 40 not out.

References

External links
Timothy Head at ESPNcricinfo
Timothy Head at CricketArchive

1957 births
Living people
People from Hammersmith
English cricketers
Sussex cricketers
Alumni of the University of Cambridge
Cambridge University cricketers
Wicket-keepers